Paul Richard Pedersen (born August 28, 1935) is a Canadian composer, arts administrator, and music educator. An associate of the Canadian Music Centre and a member of the Canadian League of Composers, he is particularly known for his works of electronic music; a number of which utilize various forms of multi-media. In 2014 he was made an Honorary Member of the Canadian Electroacoustic Community. Early on in his career, he wrote non-electronic compositions which exhibited a free atonal style.

Life
Born in Camrose, Alberta, Pedersen entered the University of Saskatchewan in 1953 where he earned a Bachelor of Arts in music in 1957. At the school he was mentored in music composition by Murray Adaskin. He matriculated to the University of Toronto (UT) where he studied composition with John Weinzweig; receiving a Master of Music in 1961. He later returned to the UT to pursue doctoral studies in musicology which focused on research in acoustic and musical psychology. Part of his research was published in the Winter 1965 edition of the Journal of Music Theory in an article entitled The mel scale. He earned a PhD from the UT in 1970 after completing his doctoral dissertation, The perception of musical pitch structure.

In 1961 Pedersen joined the music staff at Parkdale Collegiate Institute in Toronto. He left there in 1962 when he was appointed  music director of Augustana University College, a post he held through 1964. In 1966 he was appointed to the Faculty of Music at McGill University (MU) where he remained for the next 24 years. He served as the chairman of McGill's theory department from 1970–1974 and was head of the McGill University Electronic Music Studios from 1971-1974. He served as Associate-Dean of the Faculty of Music from 1974–1976 and then as Dean from 1976-1986. He was also director and executive producer of McGill University Records from 1976-1990. In 1990 Pedersen left McGill to become the Dean of the Faculty of Music at the University of Toronto.

In 2016, Concordia University in Montreal created 'The Paul Award in Electroacoustics' to celebrate Paul Pedersen's contribution to the development of electroacoustics in Canada.

References

External links 
 The Paul Pedersen Collection at Marvin Duchow Music Library, McGill University

1935 births
Living people
Canadian arts administrators
Canadian composers
Canadian male composers
Canadian music educators
Academic staff of McGill University
People from Camrose, Alberta
University of Saskatchewan alumni
University of Toronto alumni
Academic staff of the University of Toronto